Roman Bronze Works, now operated as Roman Bronze Studios, is a bronze foundry in New York City. Established in 1897 by Riccardo Bertelli, it was the first American foundry to specialize in the lost-wax casting method, and was the country's pre-eminent art foundry during the American Renaissance (ca. 1876-1917).

History

Bertelli was a chemical engineer from Genoa who combined his skill in chemistry with his interest in art in starting a foundry. The foundry trademarked its namesake, Roman Bronze Works in 1900.

In 1908, the foundry built a home and studio for sculptor Harry Merwin Shrady at White Plains, New York.  It was added to the National Register of Historic Places in 1982 as the Leo Friedlander Studio.

Long a sub-contractor to Louis Comfort Tiffany's Tiffany Studios, the foundry moved in 1927 to Tiffany's red brick factory in Corona, Queens, New York.

The foundry's mold makers, casters, chasers and finishers, and patinaters cast sculptures from plaster and terra cotta models provided by sculptors. They also scaled down monumental and other finished works for editions of collectors' bronzes, allowing works by Daniel Chester French, Augustus Lukeman and Augustus Saint-Gaudens to ornament a private library or drawing room.

From 1898, Frederic Remington worked exclusively with Roman Bronze Works, as did Charles M. Russell. Remington bronzes were being cast by Roman Bronze Works as late as the 1980s.

Roman Bronze Works was purchased in 1946 by Salvatore Schiavo, whose father had worked at the foundry since 1902. His nephew, Philip J. Schiavo, the grandson of the first Schiavo, was the president of the foundry until its closing.

The Heisman Trophy was originally made by Dieges & Clust in New York (and later Providence, Rhode Island) from its inception in 1935 until 1980, when Dieges and Clust was sold to Herff Jones. However, for a time until at least 2008, the Roman Bronze Works cast the Heisman Trophy statues awarded annually to the best college football player and his university.

After the foundry closed, original plaster models of major works by American artists Frederic Remington, Daniel Chester French, Charles Russell, Bessie Potter Vonnoh and Anna Hyatt Huntington were auctioned off in New York on September 17, 1988. Some of the molds were moved to warehouses in Copiague, New York, under the aegis of American Art Restoration, Inc.

The business archives were preserved and are now at the Amon Carter Museum Library in Fort Worth, Texas. In 2002, Schiffer Publishing released a book about Roman Bronze Works, A Century of American Sculpture; The Roman Bronze Works Foundry, written by Lucy D. Rosenfeld and based on the firm's ledgers and archival photographs at the museum.

Brian Ramnarine, who worked at Roman Bronze Works and opened his foundry in Queens (Long Island City) NY under the name Empire Bronze Art Foundry, was charged in Manhattan Federal Court in November 2012 with an $11 million scheme to sell an unauthorized casting of a work by Jasper Johns. He was arraigned in October 2002 on charges of grand larceny, falsifying business records, scheme to defraud and criminal simulation.  In February 2003 he pled guilty to making unauthorized copies of sculptures, agreeing to pay $100,000 in restitution.

Notable works

 Bronco Buster, one of many sculptures created by Remington and cast by Roman Bronze Works (ca. 1901)
 Confederate Soldiers Monument Sculptures by Pompeo Coppini located on the grounds outside the Texas State Capitol in Austin, Texas  (1903)
 The Marquis de Lafayette, by Paul Wayland Bartlett, Hartford, Connecticut (1907)
Leo Friedlander Studio in Greenburgh, Westchester County, New York  (1908)
 Stevens T. Mason by Albert Weinert (1908)
Stephenson Grand Army of the Republic Memorial by J. Massey Rhind at Indiana Plaza in Washington, D.C.  (1909)
McMillan Fountain by Herbert Adams at McMillan Reservoir in Washington, D.C.  (1912)
 Equestrian statue of George Washington by J. Massey Rhind in Washington Park, Newark, New Jersey (1912)
 The Great Rivers, the Missouri and the Mississippi, by Robert Ingersoll Aitken, Missouri State Capitol, Jefferson City, Missouri (1917)
Dante Alighieri (Ximenes) by Ettore Ximenes at Meridian Hill Park in Washington, D.C.  (1921)
Ulysses S. Grant Memorial by Henry Shrady at Capitol Hill in Washington, D.C.  (1924)
 Pioneer Woman, by Bryant Baker, Ponca City, Oklahoma (1930)
 Atlas, iconic statue by Lee Lawrie located in Rockefeller Center  (1937)
 Thomas Jefferson Statue located in the Jefferson Memorial in Washington D.C. by Rudolph Evans (1947)
Heisman Trophy by Frank Eliscu  (1980-2008)

Artists
Artists who had works cast by the Roman Bronze Works include:

 Herbert Adams
 Robert Aitken
 Carl Ethan Akeley
 Louis Amateis
 John Angel
 Joseph Bailly
 Bryant Baker
 Max Kalish
 Clement Barnhorn
 Richmond Barthé
 Paul Wayland Bartlett
 Chester Beach
 Thomas Hart Benton
 Edward Berge
 Karl Bitter
 Gutzon Borglum
 Solon Borglum
 John J. Boyle
 Caspar Buberl
 Alexander Stirling Calder
 Mary Callery
 Rene Paul Chambellan
 James L. Clark
 Matchett Herring Coe
 Pompeo Coppini
 William Couper
 Henri Crenier
 John K. Daniels
 Jo Davidson
 Donald De Lue
 Gleb Derujinsky
 Alexander Doyle
 Thomas Eakins
 Frank Eliscu
 Ulric Ellerhusen
 Rudolph Evans
 Avard Fairbanks
 Sally James Farnham
 Nicolai Fechin
 Gaetano Federici
 Beatrice Fenton
 Duncan Ferguson
 Alexander Finta
 John Flanagan
 James Earle Fraser
 Marshall Fredericks
 Daniel Chester French
 Leo Friedlander
 Harriet Whitney Frishmuth
 Sherry Fry
 Merrell Gage
 Rube Goldberg
 Charles Grafly
 John Gregory
 Walker Hancock
 Oskar J. W. Hansen
 Jonathan Scott Hartley
 Eli Harvey
 Herbert Haseltine
 Carl Augustus Heber
 Henry Hering
 Frederick Hibbard
 Malvina Hoffman
 Milton Horn
 Anna Hyatt Huntington
 C. Paul Jennewein
 Burt Johnson
 Sylvia Shaw Judson
 Charles Keck
 James Kelly
 Henry Hudson Kitson
 Theo Alice Ruggles Kitson
 Charles R. Knight
 Isidore Konti
 Mario Korbel
 Gaston Lachaise
 Albert Laessle
 Lee Lawrie
 William Robinson Leigh
 Leo Lentelli
 Oscar Lenz
 Jacques Lipchitz
 Julius Loester
 Evelyn Beatrice Longman
 Lawrence Monroe Ludtke
 Augustus Lukeman
 Frederick MacMonnies
 Hermon A. MacNeil
 Oronzio Maldarelli
 Paul Manship
 Philip Martiny
 Edward McCartan
 R. Tait McKenzie
 Ivan Meštrović
 Emily Winthrop Miles
 Burr Churchill Miller
 J. Maxwell Miller
 Carl Milles
 Bruce Moore
 Giuseppe Moretti
 Arthur C. Morgan
 Carl Mose
 Samuel Murray
 Reuben Nakian
 Charles Niehaus
 Clark Nobel
 Isamu Noguchi
 Andrew O'Connor
 Francis Packer
 Bashka Paeff
 Edith Parsons
 William Ordway Partridge
 Roland Hinton Perry
 Albin Polasek
 Joseph Pollia
 Bela Pratt
 Alexander Phimister Proctor
 Arthur Putnam
 Edmond Thomas Quinn
 Vinnie Ream
 Frederic Remington
 J. Massey Rhind
 Ulysses Ricci
 Myra Reynolds Richards
 Hugo Robus
 Carlo Romanelli
 Charles Umlauf
 Katharine Lane Weems
 Carel Wirtz
 Mahonri Young

Partnerships
Roman Bronze Works had significant partnerships with the following artists:
Frederic Remington- Although uncertain, Roman Bronze Works partnership with Frederic Remington is thought to have begun around 1901 with the creation of The Cheyenne. This marked a move from the sand process casts of the Henry-Bonnard Bronze Company to the lost-wax casting method used by Roman Bronze Works. Remington and Bertelli had a close relationship as expressed in Remington's continual presence at the foundry. Remington was often called to examine new models and to retouch the designs when necessary. Roman Bronze Works continued to create works after his death. After his and his wife's death, surmoulages were created using both original bronzes and replicas.
Charles M. Russell
Tiffany Studios

Notes

External links

Smithsonian Institution items cast by Roman Bronze Works

Foundries in the United States
American sculpture
Manufacturing companies based in New York City
American companies established in 1897
Design companies established in 1897
Corona, Queens